S. M. Velusamy (also known Se. Ma. Velusamy) is an Indian politician and former Mayor of Coimbatore Municipal Corporation. As a cadre of All India Anna Dravida Munnetra Kazhagam party, he was elected to the Tamil Nadu Legislative Assembly from Palladam constituency in 2001 and 2006 elections.

References 

All India Anna Dravida Munnetra Kazhagam politicians
Living people
Mayors of Coimbatore
People from Coimbatore
Year of birth missing (living people)
Tamil Nadu MLAs 2001–2006
Tamil Nadu MLAs 2006–2011